Synchronized swimming has been a part of the Pan American Games since the Games' second edition in 1955. In 2017, the sport was renamed to artistic swimming, and future games had that as the sport's title.

Editions

Events

Medal table
Updated until 2019 edition.

List of medallists

References

 
Pan American Games
Artistic swimming